Tixocortol is a corticosteroid used as an intestinal anti-inflammatory and decongestant.

See also 
 Tixocortol pivalate

References 

Corticosteroids
Thiols
Glucocorticoids